Acmopyle pancheri is a species of conifer in the family Podocarpaceae.
It is a tree 5–25 m high, found only in New Caledonia.

References

Podocarpaceae
Near threatened plants
Endemic flora of New Caledonia
Taxonomy articles created by Polbot
Taxa named by Adolphe-Théodore Brongniart
Taxa named by Jean Antoine Arthur Gris
Taxa named by Robert Knud Friedrich Pilger